The 2009 Jayco Herald Sun Tour was the 58th edition of the Herald Sun Tour, a six-stage bicycle race held from 11–17 October 2009 in Victoria, Australia. The race was won by Bradley Wiggins, ahead of Chris Sutton and Jonathan Cantwell.

References

Jayco Herald Sun Tour, 2009
Jayco Herald Sun Tour
UCI Oceania Tour races
Cycle races in Australia